Haensch's whorltail iguana (Stenocercus haenschi) is a species of lizard of the Tropiduridae family.

It is endemic to the Bolívar Province of Ecuador, where it is only known from one location. The lizard is considered to be critically endangered and possibly extinct.

The species is named in honor of German entomologist Richard Haensch.

References

Stenocercus
Reptiles described in 1901
Endemic fauna of Ecuador
Reptiles of Ecuador
Taxa named by Franz Werner